Christian Duarte (born February 22, 1994) is an American soccer player who currently plays for Portland Timbers 2 in the USL.

Career

Youth, College and Amateur
Duarte played his entire college career at Cal State Bakersfield.  In his four years with the Roadrunners, he made a total of 78 appearances and tallied 13 goals.

He also played in the Premier Development League for Ventura County Fusion.

Professional
On March 24, 2016, Duarte signed a professional contract with USL club Portland Timbers 2.

References

External links
T2 bio
CSU Bakersfield bio

1994 births
Living people
American soccer players
Cal State Bakersfield Roadrunners men's soccer players
Ventura County Fusion players
Portland Timbers 2 players
Association football midfielders
Soccer players from Houston
USL League Two players
USL Championship players